Olearia pimeleoides, commonly known as pimelea daisy-bush, is a species of flowering plant in the family Asteraceae and is endemic to southern continental Australia. It is an erect shrub with elliptic, linear or lance-shaped leaves, and white and pale yellow, daisy-like inflorescences.

Description
The lower surface of the leaves is densely covered with white, woolly hairs. The heads or daisy-like "flowers" are usually arranged singly on the ends of branches and are sessile,  in diameter with a conical to hemispherical involucre at the base.

Taxonomy
This daisy was first formally described in 1836 by Augustin Pyramus de Candolle who gave it the name Eurybia pimeleoides in his Prodromus Systematis Naturalis Regni Vegetabilis. In 1867, George Bentham changed the name to Olearia pimeleoides in Flora Australiensis. The specific epithet (pimeleoides) means "Pimelea-like".

Distribution and habitat
Pimelea daisy-bush is widespread and common in southern Australia, where it grows in mallee woodlands and shrublands, and in forest. It is widespread in the south-west of Western Australia, the south-east of South Australia, north-western Victoria and on the western plains of New South Wales.

References

pimeleoides
Asterales of Australia
Flora of New South Wales
Flora of South Australia
Flora of Queensland
Eudicots of Western Australia
Flora of Victoria (Australia)
Plants described in 1836
Taxa named by Augustin Pyramus de Candolle